The North Fork Musselshell River is a tributary of the Musselshell River, approximately 35 miles (56 km) long, in Montana in the United States.

It rises in the Lewis and Clark National Forest in the Little Belt Mountains in northeastern Meagher County, and flows south through Bair Reservoir, then southeast. It joins the South Fork to form the main branch of the Musselshell just west of county line with Wheatland County.

See also

List of rivers of Montana
Montana Stream Access Law

Rivers of Montana
Rivers of Wheatland County, Montana
Rivers of Meagher County, Montana